Ranatra linearis is a species of aquatic bug in the Nepidae family. It is native to Eurasia and North Africa, and primarily found near aquatic plants in ponds, marshes and other freshwater habitats, but has exceptionally been recorded from hypersaline lakes and brackish lagoons.

Description

Their breathing tube tail is usually about as long as the body of the insect. They are swimming insects, and the adults can fly.

References

External links

Insects described in 1758
Hemiptera of Europe
Taxa named by Carl Linnaeus
Nepidae